Mikhail Morozov may refer to the following people:

 Mikhail Mikhailovich Morozov (1897–1952), Russian Shakespeare scholar and translator